Syngonosaurus is an extinct genus of ornithopod dinosaur from the Early Cretaceous. It was an iguanodontian discovered in England and was first described in 1879. The type species, S. macrocercus, was described by British paleontologist Harry Seeley in 1879 and it was later synonymised with Acanthopholis, but the genus was reinstated in a 2020 study, when Syngonosaurus and Eucercosaurus were reinterpreted as basal iguanodontians.

History

In 1869 Harry Govier Seeley named several new species of Acanthopholis based on remains from the Cambridge Greensand: Acanthopholis macrocercus, based on specimens CAMSM B55570-55609; Acanthopholis platypus (CAMSM B55454-55461);  and Acanthopholis stereocercus (CAMSM B55558 55569). Later, Seeley split the material of Acanthopholis stereocercus and based a new species of Anoplosaurus on part of it: Anoplosaurus major. He also described a new species, Acanthopholis eucercus, on the basis of six caudal vertebrae (CAMSM 55552-55557). In 1902 however Franz Nopcsa changed it into another species of Acanthopholis: Acanthopholis major. Nopcsa at the same time renamed Anoplosaurus curtonotus into Acanthopholis curtonotus.  In 1879 Seeley named the genus Syngonosaurus based on part of the type material of A. macrocercus. In 1956 Friedrich von Huene renamed A. platypus into Macrurosaurus platypus.

In 1999 Xabier Pereda-Superbiola and Paul M. Barrett reviewed all Acanthopholis material. They concluded that all species were nomina dubia whose syntype specimens were composites of non-diagnostic ankylosaur and ornithopod remains; including Syngonosaurus. Syngonosaurus was seen as an ankylosaur in both a 2001 publication and a 2004 publication. Syngonosaurus was synonymised with Acanthopholis in 1999, but the genus was reinstated in a 2020 study, when Syngonosaurus and Eucercosaurus were reinterpreted as basal iguanodontians.

References

Ornithopods
Albian life
Early Cretaceous dinosaurs of Europe
Cretaceous England
Fossils of England
Fossil taxa described in 1879
Taxa named by Thomas Henry Huxley
Ornithischian genera